Fei County or Feixian falls under the jurisdiction of Linyi, in the south of Shandong Province.

Administrative divisions
As 2012, this County is divided to 1 subdistrict, 9 towns and 2 townships.
Subdistricts
Feicheng Subdistrict

Towns

Shangye
Xuezhuang
Tanyi
Zhutian
Liangqiu
Xinzhuang
Mazhuang
Huyang
Shijing

Townships
Datianzhuang Township
Nanzhangzhuang Township

Climate

References

Counties of Shandong
Linyi